Lantana is a plant genus.

Lantana may also refer to:

 Lantana (fabric), a mixture of typically 80% cotton and 20% wool
 Lantana (film), a 2001 Australian film
 Lantana (singer) (born 1980), Spanish artist
 Lantana, Florida, United States
 Lantana, Texas, United States
 FC Lantana Tallinn, a defunct Estonian football club
 Viburnum lantana, a plant species

See also
 Lanta (disambiguation)
 Lanthana, the white powdery form of lanthanum oxide